Rhoda Belle Colver (October 3, 1882 - January 24, 1977) was the Club Editor of The Spokesman-Review in Spokane.

Early life
Rhoda Belle Colver was born in Missouri Valley, Iowa, on October 3, 1882, the daughter of James E. (1859-1915) and Emma O. (1858-1939) Colver.

Career
R. Belle Colver was the Club Editor of The Spokesman-Review. In those days women were sent to cover only women's club activities and social events.

In August 1917, nine members of the Walking Club, five of them women, went on an 8-day excursion to cross Glacier Park on foot. They established a club record of 105 miles. "Outfitting for the trip was a joy in itself -- skirts were not to be worn!" wrote R. Belle Colver, one of the party "I was lucky enough to have stowed away in the attic my old 'gym' suit and I made it do". R. Belle Colver in "Spokane Walking Club Views Glacier Park on Foot", August 26, 1917, p. 2.

Colver was a delegate to the Biennial National YWCA Convention in New York on 1924.

Colver was the author of "Women of Shakespeare and the Women of the Bible", "Of such stuff are dreams, a one-act play" (1950) and "Nature's wondrous way: selections from poetic verse" (1965).

As Mowbray Arnold, Colver wrote "Waiilaptu days" (1938).

She was a member of: Spokane Sorosis, Woman's Club of Spokane, Shakespearean Study, American Association of University Women.

Personal life
R. Belle Colver moved to Spokane, Washington, in 1908 and lived at 811 E. Walton Ave., Spokane, Washington.

Colver died on January 24, 1977, and is buried with her parents at Greenwood Memorial Terrace, Spokane, Plot: Lawn-22.

References

1882 births
1977 deaths
American women journalists
20th-century American journalists
American women short story writers
20th-century American women writers
People from Harrison County, Iowa
People from Spokane, Washington